Sweden competed at the 2012 Winter Youth Olympics in Innsbruck, Austria from January 13 to January 22, 2012. The Swedish Olympic Committee announced the team on December 20, 2011.

Medalists

Alpine skiing

Boys

Girls

Biathlon

Boys

Girls

Mixed

Cross-country skiing

Boys

Girls

Sprint

Mixed

Curling

Mixed team
Skip: Rasmus Wranå  
Third: Amalia Rudström  
Second: Jordan Wåhlin  
Lead: Johanna Heldin

Round robin

Draw 1

Draw 2

Draw 3

Draw 4

Draw 5

Draw 6

Draw 7

Quarterfinal

Semifinal

Bronze medal game

Mixed doubles

Figure skating

Boys

Girls

Mixed

Freestyle skiing

Boys

Girls

Ice hockey

Girls

Group stage

Semifinal

Final

Snowboarding

Boys

Speed skating

Boys

See also
Sweden at the 2012 Summer Olympics

References

2012 in Swedish sport
Nations at the 2012 Winter Youth Olympics
Sweden at the Youth Olympics